The 1986–87 season was the 72nd season of the Isthmian League, which is an English football competition featuring semi-professional and amateur clubs from London, East and South East England. League consisted of three divisions. The Second Division was divided into two sections.

Wycombe Wanderers won the league and returned to the Conference at the first attempt.

Premier Division

The Premier Division consisted of 22 clubs, including 19 clubs from the previous season and three new clubs:
Bromley, promoted as runners-up in Division One
St Albans City, promoted as champions of Division One
Wycombe Wanderers, relegated from Alliance Premier League

League table

Division One

Division One consisted of 22 clubs, including 16 clubs from the previous season and six new clubs:

Two clubs relegated from the Premier Division:
 Billericay Town
 Epsom & Ewell

Two clubs promoted from Division Two North:
 Kingsbury Town
 Stevenage Borough

Two clubs promoted from Division Two South:
 Bracknell Town
 Southwick

League table

Division Two North

Division Two North consisted of 22 clubs, including 16 clubs from the previous season and six new clubs:

 Aveley, relegated from Division One
 Chesham United, relegated from Division One
 Collier Row, joined from the London Spartan League
 Harlow Town, relegated from Division One
 Hornchurch, relegated from Division One
 Wivenhoe Town, joined from the Essex Senior League

League table

Division Two South

Division Two South consisted of 21 clubs, including 18 clubs from the previous season and three new clubs:

 Chalfont St Peter, transferred from Division Two North
 Chertsey Town, joined from the Combined Counties League
 Harefield United, transferred from Division Two North

League table

See also
Isthmian League
1986–87 Northern Premier League
1986–87 Southern Football League

References

Isthmian League seasons
6